WM Wm, wm, or variants may refer to:

Businesses and organizations
 Walmart, an American retailing chain
 Walter Mart, a group of shopping malls in the Philippines
 WarnerMedia, formerly Time Warner, an American mass media conglomerate
 Washington Mutually, a former American savings bank (former MYSE stock symbol WM)
 Waste Management (corporation), a North American garbage company (former NYSE stock symbol WM), doing business as WM
 Western Maryland Railway, a former railway in the United States
 Winair (Windward Islands Airways) (IATA airline code WM)
 WM Entertainment, a South Korean entertainment company

Military 
 Waterloo Medal, a medal awarded to British soldiers who fought in the Waterloo campaign in 1815
 "Wehrmacht Marine", on license plates of the German Navy in World War II 
 Woman Marine, a female member of the United States Marine Corps

Science and technology

Computing
 Window manager, software that controls the placement of windows on the screen
 X window manager, a component in the X Window System
 Window Maker, a window manager for the X Window System
 Windows Media, a multimedia framework for media creation and distribution for Microsoft Windows
 Windows Messenger, a piece of software included in the Microsoft Windows XP operating system
 Windows Mobile, an operating system for Pocket PCs

Other uses in science and technology
 Waldenström's macroglobulinemia, a rare form of blood cancer
 Wave method, a model used in fluid dynamics
 White matter, a type of brain tissue
 Working memory, a part of the short-term memory

Sport 
 Die Weltmeisterschaft – German for the FIFA World Cup, informally referred to as die WM
 WM formation, a formation in association football, so called because it spells out the letters when viewed from above
 WrestleMania, a professional wrestling pay-per-view event

Other uses
 Wayback Machine
 William (name), sometimes abbreviated Wm.
 College of William & Mary, a public research university in Virginia, US
 Worshipful Master, the head of a lodge in freemasonry
 William McKinley, 25th president of the United States